Máiréad Curran (born 19 February 1964) is an Irish equestrian. She competed in two events at the 1992 Summer Olympics.

References

1964 births
Living people
Irish female equestrians
Olympic equestrians of Ireland
Equestrians at the 1992 Summer Olympics
Place of birth missing (living people)
20th-century Irish women